Mark DeWayne Moseley (born March 12, 1948) is an American former professional football player who was a placekicker in the National Football League (NFL) for 16 seasons. He played for Philadelphia Eagles (1970), the Houston Oilers (1971–72), the Washington Redskins (1974–86), and the Cleveland Browns (1986). A native of Livingston, Texas, Moseley played quarterback at Texas A&M University and Stephen F. Austin State University before switching to kicker for his senior season at Stephen F. Austin.

Drafted by the Eagles in the 14th round of the 1970 NFL Draft, he played one season with them and then two seasons with the Houston Oilers. He was out of football in 1973 before signing with the Washington Redskins in 1974, with whom he played until 1986. He won the Most Valuable Player Award during the strike-shortened 1982 season.  He is the only pure special teams player to win the Sporting News’ NFL MVP award (Lou Groza, the 1954 Sporting News MVP, played both kicker and left tackle) and is one of only three non-offensive MVPs.

Moseley was released by the Redskins in 1986 and retired that year after a few games with the Cleveland Browns.

Early life and education 
Moseley grew up in Livingston, Texas, and played football at Livingston High School. After high school, he attended Texas A&M University from 1965 to 1966 and Stephen F. Austin State University (SFA) from 1967 to 1969. He played quarterback while at both schools until his senior season at SFA when he made the switch to placekicker. In that season, he set Lone Star Conference records for most points in a game and most field goals in a season.

Professional career 
Moseley was selected 346th overall in the 14th round of the 1970 NFL Draft by the Philadelphia Eagles making him the first kicker ever drafted in the NFL. He was released by the Eagles in 1971 and signed by the Houston Oilers only to be released again in 1972. He spent two years out of the NFL and moved back to Livingston, Texas, where he installed septic systems and coached high school sports. During this period, he sent letters to two dozen NFL teams and routinely practiced kicking with his children returning his kicks. In 1974, the Washington Redskins signed him as a free agent.

With the retirement of the Minnesota Vikings' Rick Danmeier in 1982, Moseley became the sole full-time straight on placekicker in the National Football League; there has only been one other (Dirk Borgognone, who played two games in 1995) since then. In the 1960s, the "soccer-style" of kicking (wherein the kicker approaches the ball at an angle and kicks it with the instep) was introduced by the Hungarian brothers Pete and Charlie Gogolak, and it is now universal in the NFL and other levels.

In the strike-shortened 1982 season, Moseley converted 23 straight field goals from 1981-82,(a record at the time), made a league-leading 20 of 21 field goals, a then-record 95.2 success rate, and was responsible for 76 points. He became the first placekicker to ever win the Associated Press NFL Most Valuable Player; (Hall of Famer Lou Groza would win the Sporting News NFL Player of the Year Award in 1954 as a placekicker and offensive tackle, followed by George Blanda winning the same as a kicker and quarterback in 1970.) Moseley had a much rougher time in the postseason, missing four field goals in Washington's two postseason games.  But in the Washington Redskins' 27–17 victory in Super Bowl XVII over the Miami Dolphins, Moseley kicked two field goals and was successful on all three of his extra point attempts. During the following season, he led the NFL in scoring with 161 points.  He also kicked the game-winning field goal in Washington's 24-21 win over the San Francisco 49ers in the NFC championship game, despite missing four prior attempts in the game.

In 1986, the 38-year-old Moseley was released by the Washington Redskins mid-season. He remains their all-time leading scorer with 1,207 points. He signed with the Cleveland Browns and retired at the end of the season, helping them win their divisional playoff game against the New York Jets with a game-winning field goal in double overtime despite missing two field goals in regulation and another in the first overtime period.

In his career, Moseley was successful on 300 out of 457 field-goal attempts (65%), successful on 482 out of 512 extra points attempts (94%), and scored a total of 1,382 points.  He led the NFL in field goals made four times.

NFL career statistics 
Career high/best

Personal life 
Moseley owned two restaurants in Virginia and later became the director of franchising for Five Guys Enterprises. He has five children and 13 grandchildren. Moseley's younger sister, Pamela Moseley Carpenter, was murdered by Johnny Paul Penry in 1979. After the killing, Moseley was extremely critical of the criminal justice system's treatment of Penry, who was released after serving two years of a five-year sentence for rape months before the murder took place. Moseley said he supported giving Penry the death penalty.

References

External links 
 Database Football info

1948 births
American football placekickers
Cleveland Browns players
Houston Oilers players
Living people
National Conference Pro Bowl players
People from Livingston, Texas
People from Rusk County, Texas
Philadelphia Eagles players
Players of American football from Texas
Stephen F. Austin Lumberjacks football players
Texas A&M Aggies football players
Washington Redskins players
National Football League Most Valuable Player Award winners